Love Diary is the debut EP from Hong Kong singer Jinny Ng. It was released on 9 November 2010. She has received the Best Sales Local New Female Vocalist from IFPI Hong Kong Sales Awards because of the album.

Background 
Jinny Ng was known by the Hong Kong public because of the duet with Enzo, which received the Top Metro Mandarin Songs. Later, she released Love Diary with 8 songs, 2 music videos and 1 behind-the-scene video.

Track listing

Music videos

Chart performance

Singles

References 

Cantopop EPs
Jinny Ng albums
2010 EPs